Ken W. Kelly (May 19, 1946 – June 2, 2022) was an American fantasy artist. Over his 50-year career, he focused in particular on paintings in the sword and sorcery and heroic fantasy subgenres.

Biography
Kelly was the nephew of Frank Frazetta's wife Eleanor "Ellie" Frazetta ( Kelly; 1935–2009). 

Early in his career he was able to study the paintings of Frank Frazetta in the latter's studio. In the early 1970s he did a couple of cover paintings for Castle of Frankenstein magazine. Throughout the 1970s he was one of the foremost cover artists on Warren Publishing's Creepy and Eerie magazines.

He depicted Conan the Barbarian, Tarzan and the rock acts KISS, Manowar, Sleepy Hollow, Rainbow, and Ace Frehley.

His work often portrays exotic, enchanted locales and primal battlefields. He developed the artwork for Coheed and Cambria's album Good Apollo, I'm Burning Star IV, Volume Two: No World for Tomorrow, and a painting of his was used as the cover art for Alabama Thunderpussy's 2007 release, Open Fire. In 2012, one of Kelly's paintings was used for the cover of Electric Magma's 12" vinyl release Canadian Samurai II.

Kelly was a guest at the Kiss by Monster Mini Golf course in Las Vegas, Nevada, doing autograph signings of prints for the classic Kiss albums he drew cover artwork for.

Ken Kelly died on June 2, 2022, at the age of 76.

Notable album artwork

Destroyer (1976) by Kiss
Rising (1976) by Rainbow
Love Gun (1977) by Kiss
Fighting the World (1987) by Manowar 
Kings of Metal (1988) by Manowar 
The Triumph of Steel (1992) by Manowar
Louder than Hell (1996) by Manowar
Gods of War (2007) by Manowar
Destroyer: Resurrected (2012) by Kiss
The Lord of Steel (2012) by Manowar
Space Invader (2014) by Ace Frehley
Volume (EP) (2019) by The Vindicated
Shadow Rising (2019) by Stormburner

Games

 Witchaven (1995, cover illustration) (video game)
 Conan: Adventures in an Age Undreamed Of (2016, Modiphius Entertainment, inner pages illustrations by Ken Kelly, among others) (tabletop roleplaying game)

Toys 

 Micronauts (1979 packaging art) by MEGO
 Micronauts (2016, packaging art) by Hasbro
 Roboskull MKII (2021, 2022, packaging art) by SKELETRON

References

External links
 kenkellyfantasyart.com
 
 

1946 births
2022 deaths
20th-century American painters
21st-century American painters
Album-cover and concert-poster artists
American speculative fiction artists
Artists from Connecticut
Fantasy artists
People from New London, Connecticut
Role-playing game artists